Selligueain A is an A type proanthocyanidin trimer of the propelargonidin type.

It can be extracted from the rhizome of the fern Selliguea feei collected in Indonesia.

It has sweetener properties with relative sweetness of 35 times as compared to the intensity of a 2% w/v aqueous sucrose solution.

References

External links

Condensed tannins
Natural phenol trimers
Sugar substitutes
Resorcinols